Warp and weft are the two basic components used in weaving to turn thread or yarn into fabric. The lengthwise or longitudinal warp yarns are held stationary in tension on a frame or loom while the transverse weft (sometimes woof) is drawn through and inserted over and under the warp. A single thread of the weft crossing the warp is called a pick. Terms vary (for instance, in North America, the weft is sometimes referred to as the fill or the filling yarn). Each individual warp thread in a fabric is called a warp end or end.

Inventions during the 18th century spurred the Industrial Revolution, with the "picking stick" and the "flying shuttle" (John Kay, 1733) speeding up the production of cloth. The power loom patented by Edmund Cartwright in 1785 allowed sixty picks per minute.

Etymology
The word weft derives from the Old English word wefan, to weave. Warp means "that which is thrown away" (Old English wearp, from weorpan, to throw, cf. German werfen, Dutch werpen).

Warp

The warp is the set of yarns or other things stretched in place on a loom before the weft is introduced during the weaving process. It is regarded as the longitudinal set in a finished fabric with two or more sets of elements.

The term is also used for a set of yarns established before the interworking of weft yarns by some other method, such as finger manipulation, yielding wrapped or twined structures.  Very simple looms use a spiral warp, in which the warp is made up of a single, very long yarn wound in a spiral pattern around a pair of sticks or beams.

The warp must be strong to be held under high tension during the weaving process, unlike the weft which carries almost no tension.  This requires the yarn used for warp ends, or individual warp threads, to be made of spun and plied fibre. Traditionally wool, linen, alpaca, and silk were used.  However, improvements in spinning technology during the Industrial Revolution created cotton yarn of sufficient strength to be used in mechanized weaving. Later, artificial or man-made fibres such as nylon or rayon were employed.

While most weaving is weft-faced, warp-faced textiles are created using densely arranged warp threads. In these the design is in the warp, requiring all colors to be decided upon and placed during the first part of the weaving process, which cannot be changed. Such limitations of color placement create weavings defined by length-wise stripes and vertical designs. Many South American cultures, including the ancient Incas and Aymaras, employed backstrap weaving, which uses the weight of the weaver's body to control the tension of the loom.

Weft

Because the weft does not have to be stretched on a loom the way the warp is, it can generally be less strong. It is usually made of spun fibre, originally wool, flax and cotton, today often of synthetic fibre such as nylon or rayon.

The weft is threaded through the warp using a "shuttle", air jets or "rapier grippers". Handlooms were the original weaver's tool, with the shuttle being threaded through alternately raised warps by hand.

As metaphor

The expression "warp and weft" (also "warp and woof" and "woof and warp") is used metaphorically the way "fabric" is; e.g., "the warp and woof of a student's life" equates to "the fabric of a student's life". Warp and weft are sometimes used even more generally in literature to describe the basic dichotomy of the world we live in, as in, up/down, in/out, black/white, Sun/Moon, yin/yang, etc. The expression is also used similarly for the underlying structure upon which something is built. The terms "warp" and "woof" are also found in some English translations of the Bible in the discussion of mildews found in cloth materials in Leviticus 13:48-59.

See also
 Knot density
 Pile (textile)
 Warp knitting

Notes

References

 
 

Weaving